Roccavione is a comune (municipality) in the Province of Cuneo in the Italian region Piedmont, located about  south of Turin and about  southwest of Cuneo.

Located in the Valle Vermenagna, it is also known as "the Alps' gate".

References

Cities and towns in Piedmont